The discography of Jamaican singer Popcaan consists of five studio albums, three mixtapes, five extended plays, 151 singles, 15 singles as a featured artist, and 26 music videos.

Studio albums

Mixtapes

Extended plays

Singles

As lead artist

As featured artist

Music videos

Notes

References 

Discographies of Jamaican artists